French River may refer to:

Rivers
French River (Ontario), Canada
French River (Massachusetts), United States
 French River (Minnesota)
Any river within the country of France; see List of rivers of France
 A river in the eastern part of Quetico Provincial Park in Ontario, Canada

Other places
 French River, Colchester County, a community in Nova Scotia, Canada
 French River, Minnesota, an unincorporated community in the United States
 French River, Nova Scotia (disambiguation), 3 locations in Nova Scotia
 French River, Ontario, a municipality in Canada
 French River 13, Ontario, a First Nations reserve
 French River, Pictou County, a community in Nova Scotia, Canada
 French River, Prince Edward Island

See also
 French Broad River, a river in the southeastern United States
 French Creek, New York
 French Creek (Allegheny River tributary)
 French (disambiguation)